Jorge Daniel Núñez (born 22 September 1984) is a Paraguayan football midfielder who plays for Once Caldas in Colombia.

Career
Núñez began his playing career in 2004 with Sport Colombia, he has also played for Sportivo Luqueño, Guaraní, Nacional and Cerro Porteño in Paraguay. He also played for Vélez Sársfield in Argentina

External links
 Primera Division Argentina statistics
 BDFA profile

1984 births
Living people
People from Ñemby
Paraguayan footballers
Paraguayan expatriate footballers
Paraguay international footballers
Sportivo Luqueño players
Club Atlético Vélez Sarsfield footballers
Cerro Porteño players
Club Guaraní players
Once Caldas footballers
Club Olimpia footballers
La Equidad footballers
Club Rubio Ñu footballers
Paraguayan Primera División players
Argentine Primera División players
Categoría Primera A players
Expatriate footballers in Argentina
Expatriate footballers in Colombia
Association football midfielders